Regina—Lake Centre was a federal electoral district in Saskatchewan, Canada, that was represented in the House of Commons of Canada from 1968 to 1979.

This riding was created in 1966 from parts of Humboldt—Melfort, Moose Jaw—Lake Centre, Qu'Appelle, Regina City, Rosetown—Biggar, Rosthern and Yorkton ridings.

It was abolished in 1976 when it was redistributed into Humboldt—Lake Centre, Moose Jaw and Regina West ridings.

Election results

See also 

 List of Canadian federal electoral districts
 Past Canadian electoral districts

External links 

Former federal electoral districts of Saskatchewan